Halton railway station served Halton, Cheshire, England, on the Birkenhead Joint Railway. It was closed in 1952.

References

Further reading

Disused railway stations in the Borough of Halton
Former Birkenhead Railway stations
Railway stations in Great Britain opened in 1851
Railway stations in Great Britain closed in 1952
1851 establishments in England